Malta competed in the Eurovision Song Contest 2001, held on 12 May 2001 at Parken Stadium in Copenhagen, Denmark. The Maltese entry was selected through the Malta Song for Europe contest, where the winner was Fabrizio Faniello with the song "Another Summer Night". Malta performed 21st out of the 23 countries competing in the contest and placed ninth with 48 points.

Background 

Prior to the 2001 contest, Malta had participated in the Eurovision Song Contest 13 times since its first entry in 1971. Malta briefly competed in the Eurovision Song Contest in the 1970s before withdrawing for 16 years. The country had, to this point, competed in every contest since returning in 1991. Malta's best placing in the contest thus far was third, which it achieved in both 1992 with the song "Little Child" performed by Mary Spiteri and in 1998 with the song "The One that I Love" by Chiara.

Before Eurovision

Malta Song for Europe 2001 
The final was held on 2 and 3 February 2001 at the Mediterranean Conference Centre in Valletta, hosted by Louise Tedesco, Claire Fabri and Antonella Vassallo. The winner was chosen by an "expert" jury (7/8) & televoting (1/8).

Promotion
To promote the entry, a music video of "Another Summer Night" was released and Faniello toured Europe, making appearances on television and speaking to the press in Denmark, Germany, Greece, Spain, Sweden, Turkey and the UK.

At Eurovision
The Eurovision Song Contest 2001 took place at Parken Stadium in Copenhagen, Denmark, on 12 May 2001. The relegation rules introduced for the 1997 contest were again utilised ahead of the 2001 contest, based on each country's average points total in previous contests. Malta's five year contest average allowed the nation to continue to participate this year. 

In the lead up to the event, BBC News noted that the entry was a favourite to win based on an online poll of fans, while bookmakers had the entry placing in the top five. On the night of the event, Faniello performed for Malta in position 21, and at the close of the voting, the entry placed ninth, having received 48 points.

Voting 

Voting during the show involved each country awarding points from 1-8, 10 and 12 as determined by either 100% televoting or a combination of 50% televoting and 50% national jury. In cases where televoting was not possible, only the votes of the eight-member national juries were tabulated. Malta received 48 points, which included the top 12 points from Denmark. The nation awarded its 12 points to contest winners Estonia.

References

2001
Countries in the Eurovision Song Contest 2001
Eurovision